Palpita freemanalis, or Freeman's palpita moth, is a moth in the family Crambidae. It was described by Eugene G. Munroe in 1952. It is found in North America, where it has been recorded from Alabama, Illinois, Indiana, Louisiana, Maryland, Mississippi, North Carolina, Oklahoma, South Carolina, Tennessee and Texas.

The wingspan is 20–22 mm.Adults have been recorded from March to September, with most records from August.

References

Moths described in 1952
Palpita
Moths of North America